Charodei (translations    Enchanters, Sorcerers, Magicians) is a 1982 Soviet romantic fantasy musical film directed by Konstantin Bromberg.

Plot summary 
Ivan Puhov (Abdulov) is in love with a very kind and friendly girl, Alyona (Yakovleva). Alyona works as a witch in a research institution that researches magic called NUINU (Scientific Universal Institute of Extraordinary Services, a NIICHAVO subsidiary in Kitezhgrad; for NIICHAVO see Monday Begins on Saturday). The couple are about to get married when Alyona's jealous and scheming co-worker, Sataneev (Gaft), tricks Alyona's boss, Kira Shemahanskaya (Vasilyeva), the institute director, into putting a spell on Alyona. The spell makes Alyona undergo a severe personality change, become unable to control her actions, and forget about Ivan. Ivan and Alyona's friends must figure out a way to break the curse while simultaneously protecting the institution's latest research development, a magic wand.

Cast 
 Aleksandra Yakovleva as Alyona Igorevna Sanina "Alyonushka" 
 Aleksandr Abdulov as Ivan Sergeevich Puhov
 Yekaterina Vasilyeva as Kira Anatolyevna Shemahanskaya (vocal by Zhanna Rozhdestvenskaya)
 Valentin Gaft as Apollon Mitrofanovich Sataneev
 Yevgeny Vesnik as chairman of the commission
 Valery Zolotukhin as Ivan Kivrin
 Emmanuil Vitorgan as Viktor Kovrov
 Mikhail Svetin as Foma Ostapych Bryl
 Roman Filippov as Modest Matveevich Kamneyedov
 Anna Ashimova as Nina Puhova
 Semyon Farada as The Guest from South
 Leonid Kharitonov as Amatin

Production
The film was initially written by brothers Boris and Arkady Strugatsky as adaptation of their 1965 science fantasy novel Monday Begins on Saturday. But Bromberg turned down the script due to its serious tone and social commentary, and the Strugatskys had to rewrite their script as a light-hearted romantic comedy. As a result, the movie bore almost no resemblance to the book besides the setting and several characters' names. History later repeated itself with another film by Sokurov Days of Eclipse (Dni zatmeniya).

The film became a classic Soviet New Year's Eve romantic comedy, similar to Irony of Fate (Ironiya sud'by) and The Carnival Night (Karnavalnaya noch).

Film soundtrack 
Film soundtrack includes many classical Soviet songs (some of them romantic), written by Yevgeni Krylatov and Leonid Derbenyov, including:
 "A woman's Enigma" (() performed by Irina Otieva
 "Three White Horses" (Три белых коня) performed by Larisa Dolina
 "A Song About A Snowflake" (Песня о снежинке) performed by Olga Rozhdestvenskaya and Dobrie Molodtsy band
 "Witch-River" (Ведьма-речка) performed by Irina Otieva
 "A Song About a Suit" (Песенка про костюмчик) performed by Emmanuil Vitorgan and Mikhail Svetin
 "Imagine That" (Представь себе) performed by Aleksandr Abdulov
 "Time to Sleep" (Спать пора) performed by Mikhail Svetin
 "Serenade" (Серенада) performed by original cast members
 "Centaurs" (Кентавры) performed by Dobrie Molodtsy
 "By The Mirror" (Подойду я к зеркалу) performed by Zhanna Rozhdestvenskaya
 "You Can't Command Your Heart" (Только сердцу не прикажешь) performed by Zhanna Rozhdestvenskaya and Vladislav Lynkovskiy
 "Don't Believe What They Say" (Говорят, а ты не верь) performed by original cast members

Music performance by State Symphony Orchestra of Cinematography of the USSR.

References

External links

Films based on works by Arkady and Boris Strugatsky
1982 films
1982 in the Soviet Union
1980s science fiction comedy films
Soviet science fiction comedy films
Soviet musical comedy films
1980s Russian-language films
Soviet fantasy films
Russian fantasy films
Soviet television films
Odesa Film Studio films
1980s musical comedy films
Films based on science fiction novels
Films based on Russian novels
Films shot in Moscow
Films shot in Vladimir Oblast
Science fiction television films
Films about witchcraft
The Devil in film
1982 comedy films